is a town located in Mikata District, Hyōgo Prefecture, Japan. , the town had an estimated population of 16,256 in 6368 households and a population density of 44 persons per km². The Ojiro neighborhood of the town is designated as one of the Most Beautiful Villages in Japan. Kami is the birthplace of Tajiri-go, a Tajima Cattle who is the ancestor of more than 99.9% of Japanese Black wagyu.

Geography 
Kami is located in the northern part of Hyōgo Prefecture and the Kinki region, facing the Sea of Japan in the north. It lies entirely within the San'in Kaigan Geopark. In addition, the mountainous area in the south is within the borders of the Hyōnosen-Ushiroyama-Nagisan Quasi-National Park. The area is part of the snow country and is characterized by heavy accumulations of snow in winter.

Neighbouring municipalities 
Hyōgo Prefecture
 Shin'onsen
 Toyooka
 Yabu
Tottori Prefecture
 Wakasa

Climate
Kami has a humid subtropical climate (Köppen climate classification Cfa) with hot summers and cool to cold winters. Precipitation is significantly higher in summer than in winter, though on the whole lower than most parts of Honshū, and there is no significant snowfall.

Demographics
Per Japanese census data, the population of Kami in 2020 is 16,064 people. Kami has been conducting censuses since 1920.

History
The area of the modern town of Kami was within ancient Tajima Province.In the Edo Period, it was divided between Izushi Domain, Toyooka Domain and tenryo territory under direct administration of the Tokugawa shogunate. Following the Meiji restoration, the village of   Kasumi (香住) was created within Mikami District, which later became Kinosaki District, Hyōgo.  It was raised to town status on October 1, 1925. The town of Kami was formed by the merger of Kasumi with the towns of Mikata and Muraoka, both from Mikata District on April 1, 2005.

Government
Kami has a mayor-council form of government with a directly elected mayor and a unicameral town council of 16 members. Kami, together with the town of Shin'onsen contributes one member to the Hyogo Prefectural Assembly. In terms of national politics, the town is part of Hyōgo 5th district of the lower house of the Diet of Japan.

Economy
Kami has a mixed economy of commercial fishing and agriculture. It is one of then leading fishing ports for snow crab. The town is known for its production of "Tajima beef".

Education
Kami has ten public elementary schools and three public middle schools operated by the town government and two public high schools operated by the Hyōgo Prefectural Department of Education. The prefecture also operates a special education school for the handicapped.

Transportation

Railway
 JR West – San'in Main Line
   -  -  -  -

Highway

Sister cities
 Amagasaki, Hyogo Prefecture, Japan
 Kadoma, Osaka Prefecture, Japan
 Suita, Osaka Prefecture, Japan

Local attractions
 Amarube Viaduct
  Tajima Plateau Botanical Gardens
 San'in Kaigan Geopark

References

External links

Kami official website 

Towns in Hyōgo Prefecture
Kami, Hyōgo (Mikata)
Populated coastal places in Japan